Azarmi Dukht Safavi (born 1948) is an Indian scholar, founding director of the Institute of Persian Research and the head of the Persian Language Research Center at Aligarh Muslim University. She is the president of the All India Persian Teachers’ Association, New Delhi, and the editor of the magazine Ghand Parsi.

Safavi is known for her works in the Gulistan.

Education

After completing her primary and secondary education, Safavi joined Aligarh Muslim University to pursue higher studies in Persian. She completed her B.A. in 1966, M.A. in 1968, and Ph.D. in Persian in 1974. The topic of her Ph.D. thesis was "Sadi as a Humanist and Lyricist". Her Ph.D. supervisor was the late Nazeer Ahmad.

After finishing her Ph.D., Safavi was appointed as a lecturer in the Department of Persian, where she taught as a professor for 32 years. She speaks Persian, English, Urdu, and Hindi.

Persian origin
Safavi is from the family of the Nawabs of Lucknow (Uttar Pradesh, India), and her family belongs to the Safavid dynasty of Iran. Shah Rahmatullah Safavi, the great grandfather of Safavi, came to India during the reign of the Indian Mughal king Muhammad Shah in 1737. He was the governor of Azeemabad (Patna). Later on, the family migrated to Delhi and Lucknow before settling in Shamsabad, Uttar Pradesh. Safavi's great grandfather Nawab Wali, alias Nawab Dulha, was a prolific writer and author of more than 20 books in Persian. Her father, Mohammad Sadiq Safavi, was her first Persian teacher and inspired her to study the language. He was a Persian scholar who completed his M.A. in Persian at Aligarh Muslim University. His articles were regularly published in leading Iranian literary journals, including Yaghma and Sukhan.

Institute of Persian Research
Safavi is the founder-director of the Institute established in 2006 at Aligarh Muslim University. She wrote a proposal to establish the Institute, which was approved by the Government of India. The Institute is focused on developing Persian language and literature. Its programs include Publication, Seminars/Conferences, lectures by eminent Iranian and Indian scholars, and training in modern/spoken Persian. The Institute has published 45 books and monographs and organized seven seminars to date.

In 2006, Safavi established the Persian Language Research Center at Aligarh University.

Publications

Safavi has published more than 150 research papers in Persian, English, and Urdu in national and international journals.

Books

Tashreeh-ul-Aqwam, Critical Edition with Introduction and Notes
Akhbar-ul-Jamal, Critical Edition with Introduction and Notes
Bahr-e-Zakhkhar, (03 Volumes) Critical Edition with Introduction and Notes
Relevance of Rumi's Thought in Modern Times 
Sufistic Literature in Persian: Tradition and Dimensions, Vol. I & II
Aftab-e-Alamtab, Critical Edition with Introduction and Notes
Tazkirah Writing in Persian, Vol. I & II
Revisiting Adabiat-e-Dastani in Persian, Vol. I, II
Unsut-Taibeen – English Translation
Persian Masnawi, Vol. I, II
Arafatul Ashiqin, Volume 2, Critical Edition with Introduction and Notes
Post Islamic Revolution Short Stories in Iran, Translation from Persian
Indo-Iranian Heritage, Vol. I, II
Nazm-e-Guzidah, Critical Edition with Introduction and Notes
Silkus Suluk, Critical Edition with Introduction and Notes
Chehl Namoos, Critical Edition with Introduction and Notes
Persian Ghazal: Tradition and Dimensions, Vol. I & II
Indology and Persian Literature
Humanism and Universal Brotherhood in Persian Literature, Vol. I, II
Revolution & Creativity
Ijaz Khusravi, English Translation, Vol. I
Mukhkhul Maana, Critical Edition with Introduction and notes
Impact of Persian Language & Culture on India
Indo-Iran Relations
Contribution of Persian Language and Literature to the Composite Culture of India
Adab Shanasi
Unsut-Taibeen – Annotated English Translation of Shiakh Ahmad Jam's Famous Sufistic Treatise; Zohra Publications, London, U.K.

See also
Persian Inscriptions on Indian Monuments

References

 Head of Persian Language Research Center at India's Aligarh Muslim University Professor Azarmidokht Safavi, 
 Indian university holds confab on Iran's mystic poet Mowlavi 
 Iranology Foundation.

Further reading
Bibliography:the Life and works of Prof. Safavi, 212 pages,Published : Anjuman-i-Asar-o-Mafakhir-i-Milli, Tehran, Urdebehesht, 1394 (May 2015)
 Mushirul Hasan: "Nationalist and Separatist Trends in Aligarh, 1915–47" in Indian Economic and Social History Review (Jan 1985), Vol. 22 Issue 1, pp 1–33
 Gail Minault and David Lelyveld: "The Campaign for a Muslim University 1898–1920" in Modern Asian Studies (March 1974) 8#2 pp 145–189

20th-century Indian linguists
1948 births
Aligarh Muslim University alumni
Living people
Recipients of the Saadi Literary Award
Indian women linguists
20th-century Indian women writers
20th-century Indian writers
Women writers from Uttar Pradesh
Educators from Uttar Pradesh
Women educators from Uttar Pradesh
Indian people of Iranian descent
People related to Persian literature
Shahnameh Researchers